Ali Payami is an Persian-Swedish record producer, songwriter, and DJ.

Payami's first number one hit on the Billboard Hot 100 was The Weeknd's single "Can't Feel My Face". In 2016, he won a Grammy for Album of the Year for his contributions on Taylor Swift's album 1989. He has also worked with other musicians such as Demi Lovato, Ariana Grande, Ellie Goulding and Katy Perry.

Early life 
Ali was first exposed to music in Malmö, Sweden, when he was a child. At a young age he listened to many genres of music, ranging from Dr. Dre's The Chronic to Nirvana. He watched people in bands rehearse and make music, which prompted him to develop interest in the same. This interest was reflected by his statement "When you play something and see people's reactions when they hear it... It really affected me."

Growing up, however, he became more interested in house music, siding away from the pop genre he was exposed to. This was evident from his words "...these guys were more into pop and mainstream, and I chose more house music..." in an interview. Payami didn't understand how to make music when he was younger. However, as years passed and new, better software became available for music production, he learnt the basics by watching others do so. Later, he bought the programs and started creating music himself.

Ali Payami then started DJing at school parties and in local clubs. He said “DJing played a big part in what I do now; the mentality of it and the love of both new and old music. When you play something and see people's reactions when they hear it... It really affected me.” in an interview with Billboard. While working in clubs, Payami had to get other jobs to support himself, including a short lived job as a telemarketer. He described this experience as "weird", stating “I loved DJing, but what I didn't like was being the center of attention.”

Career

Beginnings 
Ali Payami met Julius Petersson, then an A&R for Warner/Chappel, during the time he was DJing in clubs. This provided him a major opportunity at the time, as the public house gave him a cash advance. In Payami's words, "It allowed me to not have to work on anything else but music, so you can eat but also concentrate on what you want to do". Payami was also grateful to Julius and considered him a visionary, stating "Julius was such a visionary. He believed in not just me, but a lot of people who are very successful now."

Through Petersson, Max Martin's brother-in-law, Payami was introduced to Shellback, a highly successful Swedish music producer. This eventually enabled Payami to collaborate with Max Martin. Payami commented on Martin, saying "He's not only amazing and talented the way everyone knows him, but he's also a great guy. It's not just music; you learn so much about life, how to collaborate with people, and how to be open and not let egos take over the room.”

Rise to fame 
Ali Payami's collaborations with Max Martin since 2014 have been an "ubiquitous part of the pop radio landscape", as described by Billboard. His work on Ariana Grande's song "Love Me Harder" was one of the first of such collaborations, on which Payami commented, "I remember sitting in a studio in L.A. and me and [Peter Svensson] were just playing around. A few days later, he showed me this voice note with a part of a melody that we had played, and we tried to recreate it. From there, the whole thing came together. Savan came in with more melodies and lyrics, and then after that The Weeknd did his thing."

Ali Payami worked on The Weeknd's song "Can't Feel My Face", which helped him settle himself as a popular pop artist. The song hit No.1 on the Billboard Hot 100 and obtained two Grammy nominations, for "Record of the Year" and "Best Pop Solo Performance". Payami said that it was a very simple song, and not "super advanced". Max Martin, on Payami, jokingly commented that he was envious of him, who "listened to new music all the time"

Payami has worked with Taylor Swift, co-writing and co-producing "Style" from her album 1989 (2014), and "...Ready for It?" from Reputation (2017).

Payami co-wrote and co-produced Katy Perry's single "Chained to the Rhythm" from her album Witness (2017).

Payami resides in Stockholm and works in Wolf Cousins Studio.

Discography

Albums

Produced Songs

References 

Swedish male singers
Swedish record producers
Iranian emigrants to Sweden
Musicians from Tehran
Living people
Swedish singer-songwriters
Remixers
Swedish DJs
Musicians from Malmö
Extensive Music artists
Electronic dance music DJs
Year of birth missing (living people)